Edward Morris Whited (born February 9, 1964) is an American former Major League Baseball third baseman who played in 36 games for the Atlanta Braves during their 1989 season.

Biography
A native of Bristol, Pennsylvania, Whited attended Rider University, and in 1984 he played collegiate summer baseball with the Falmouth Commodores of the Cape Cod Baseball League. He was selected by the Houston Astros in the 18th round of the 1986 MLB Draft. In 1987, while playing for the Asheville Tourists, Whited was named the South Atlantic League MVP.

References

External links

1964 births
Living people
People from Bristol, Pennsylvania
Major League Baseball third basemen
Baseball players from Pennsylvania
Atlanta Braves players
Rider Broncs baseball players
Falmouth Commodores players
Asheville Tourists players
Auburn Astros players
Greenville Braves players
Richmond Braves players
Hightstown High School alumni